Tutejsi may refer to:

 Poleszuk, the people inhabiting Polesia
 Tutejszy, a self-identification translated as 'local' or 'from here', used in Poland, Ukraine, Belarus, and Lithuania